Croydon Rugby Football Club, founded in 1956 as Shirley Wanderers RFC, and are based at Addington Road, West Wickham, in the London Borough of Bromley, south London.  Croydon are currently playing in the Rugby Football Union Surrey 3 league following their promotion from Surrey 4 at the end of the 2019–20 season.  They also compete in the local Surrey RFU Knockout Competitions.  Croydon currently field 2 senior sides, a growing Tinies (3-7yrs) Rhinos (8-10yrs) groups and also a junior boys section (Under 16).

Club history

Formed as Shirley Wanderers RFC in 1956, by a mixture of experienced players and those who were new to the game. After 7 years as a wandering size the club opened a clubhouse on the present site and leased 3 pitches, of which 2 remain.  In 2003, Shirley Wanderers welcomed the players of Old Croydonian RFC after the club lost its supply on youth players, and then had to rely on players relocating to the area for employment and from non-playing rugby schools, and therefore started having troubles fielding a side, leading to the renaming of the club as Croydon RFC.

Club Honours
Surrey 2 champions (2): 2004–05, 2005–06
Surrey 4 champions: 2019–20

External links
Official Croydon Rugby website
History of Croydon RFC

Rugby clubs established in 1956
Sport in the London Borough of Croydon
English rugby union teams
Rugby union clubs in London
1956 establishments in England